The Howard and Lucy Linn House is a historic house at 555 Shoreacres Drive in Lake Bluff, Illinois. The house was built in 1927 for Lucy Linn, the founder or president of multiple Chicago social organizations and a member of the prominent McCormick family, and her husband Howard, a businessman and aviator. The couple was typical of the wealthy, socially prominent people who built estates in Lake Bluff and neighboring Lake Forest. Architect Walter S. Frazier of the firm Frazier & Raftery designed the house in the French Renaissance Revival style, a choice inspired by Howard's service in France in World War I. The house has an asymmetrical plan with a stucco exterior, a loggia at the front entrance, a central courtyard, and several porches.

The house was added to the National Register of Historic Places on November 15, 2005.

References

National Register of Historic Places in Lake County, Illinois
Houses on the National Register of Historic Places in Illinois
Renaissance Revival architecture in Illinois
Houses completed in 1927
Lake Bluff, Illinois